Crisologo Abines (August 3, 1947 – January 28, 2008) was a former First Lieutenant in the Philippine Army assigned in the Logistics Service, Visayas Command. A Filipino public servant who was the youngest municipal mayor during his generation serving the Cebu Province . He was elected to three consecutive terms in the House of Representatives, representing the 2nd District of Cebu from 1987 to 1998. He served in the Eighth, Ninth and Tenth Congresses.

After his service in Congress, Abines was tried along with three others for the 1999 homicide case of his assailant inside a cockpit in Santander, Cebu. He was eventually acquitted by the Sandiganbayan, upon presentation of evidence that he was instead the victim and was first fired upon.

During the 2007 elections, Abines served as the provincial chairman of the United Opposition for Cebu. He died of a myocardial infarction in January of the following year.

Notes

People from Cebu
1947 births
2008 deaths
United Opposition (Philippines) politicians
Members of the House of Representatives of the Philippines from Cebu